This is a list of venues used for professional baseball in Milwaukee, Wisconsin, presented in chronological order.

(1) West End Grounds
Home of: Milwaukee West Ends – independent (1876) – League Alliance (1877)
Location: Wells Avenue, near city limits

(2) Milwaukee Base-Ball Grounds
Home of: Milwaukee Brewers or Grays – National League (1878)
Location: West Clybourn Street (south); North 10th Street (east); North 11th Street (west); Clermont Street Teed into Clybourn from the south
Currently: Underneath the Marquette Interchange of the freeway system

(3) Wright Street Grounds
Home of:
Milwaukee Brewers a.k.a. "Cream City" – Northwestern League (1884) – joined Union Association (1884 part) – Western League (1885) – Northwestern League (1886–1887)
Neutral site for Chicago White Stockings – NL – vs. Buffalo and vs. Providence, one game apiece in Sept 1885.
Location: West Clarke, North 11th, North 12th, West Wright streets
Currently: Residential homes

(4) Athletic Park
Home of:
Milwaukee Creams or Brewers – Western League (1888–1894)
Milwaukee Brewers – American Association (1891 last half)
Location: same as Borchert Field (see below)

(5) Lloyd Street Grounds
Home of:
Milwaukee Brewers – Western League (1895–1900) became American League (1901) (club moved to St. Louis 1902)
Milwaukee Creams – Western League (1902–1903)
Location: West Lloyd Street (south, home plate); houses and businesses, and West North Avenue (north, center field); North 16th Street (east, right field/first base); houses and North 18th Street (west, left field/third base)
Currently: Residential homes

(6) Borchert Field (previously Athletic Park and Brewer Field)
Home of:
Milwaukee Brewers – American Association (1902–1952)
Milwaukee Bears – Negro National League (1923)
Kosciuszko Reds – Wisconsin State League (1928–1930)
Milwaukee Red Sox – Wisconsin State League (1931–1932, 1936)
Milwaukee Chicks – All-American Girls Professional Baseball League (1944)
Location: North 7th Street (first base, east); North 8th Street (third base, west); Chambers Street (home plate, south); Burleigh Street (north, center field)
Currently: I-43

(7) Milwaukee County Stadium
Home of:
Milwaukee Braves – National League (1953–1965)
Chicago White Sox – American League (some games during 1968–1969)
Milwaukee Brewers – American League (1970–1997); moved to National League (1998–2000)
Location: 201 S. 46th St – Southwest of the intersection of Interstate 94 (I-94), U.S. Highway 41 (US 41), and Wisconsin Highway 341 (WIS 341).
Currently: Structure razed in 2001, infield remains as Little League Baseball park Helfaer Field

(8) American Family Field (originally Miller Park)
Home of: Milwaukee Brewers – National League (2001–present)
Location: 1 Brewers way – Next to County Stadium site – Southwest of the intersection of I-94, and Brewers Boulevard (WIS 175).

See also
Lists of baseball parks
Parks of Milwaukee

Sources
Peter Filichia, Professional Baseball Franchises, Facts on File, 1993.
Phil Lowry, Green Cathedrals,  several editions.
Michael Benson, Ballparks of North America, McFarland, 1989.
Brian A. Podoll, The Minor League Milwaukee Brewers, McFarland, 2003.
Baseball Memories, by Marc Okkonen, Sterling Publishing, 1992.

Baseball venues in Wisconsin
Milwaukee, Wisconsin

Baseball
Baseball parks